Solomon "Sol" Encel (3 March 192523 July 2010) was a noted Jewish-Australian academic, sociologist and political scientist.

He received an M.A. (1952) and Ph.D. (1960), both from the University of Melbourne. He was Professor of Sociology at the University of New South Wales (1966–1990), Senior Lecturer and Reader in Political Science at the Australian National University, Canberra (1956–1966), and Tutor and Lecturer in Political Science at the University of Melbourne (1952–1955).

He was the author of numerous books and articles, particularly including two landmark books, Australian Society (1965, with Alan Davies) and Equality and Authority in Australia (1970).

References

External links
University of New South Wales Social Policy Research Centre 'Emeritus Professor Sol Encel 1925-2010'
Sol Encel - a tribute, The Science Show, ABC Radio National, 14 August 2010 (also downloadable as mp3 audio file:  Sol Encel - a tribute).

1925 births
2010 deaths
Australian people of Polish-Jewish descent
Australian sociologists
Academic staff of the University of New South Wales
Jewish Australian academics